Ludus duodecim scriptorum, or XII scripta, was a board game popular during the time of the Roman Empire. The name translates as "game of twelve markings", probably referring to the three rows of 12 markings each found on most surviving boards. The game tabula is thought to be a descendant of this game, and both are tables games as is modern backgammon.

It has been speculated that XII scripta is related to the Egyptian game senet, but some consider this doubtful because, with the exception of limited superficial similarities between the appearance of the boards, and the use of dice, there is no known evidence linking the games. Another factor casting doubt on this link is that the latest known classical senet board is over half of a millennium older than the earliest known XII scripta board.

Very little information about specific gameplay has survived. The game was played using three cubic dice, and each player had 15 pieces. A possible "beginners' board", having spaces marked with letters, has suggested a possible path for the movement of pieces.

The earliest known mention of the game is in Ovid's Ars Amatoria (The Art of Love) (written between 1 BC and 8 AD). An ancient example of the game was excavated at the archaeological site of Kibyra in southern Turkey.

References

External links
 Duodecim scipta: Latin game rules by Caelestis Eichenseer 1985
— The Lines of the Twelve Philosophers, which may be related to XII scripta

Ancient Roman leisure
Historical tables games
Latin words and phrases